Project Coast was a 1980s top-secret chemical and biological weapons (CBW) program instituted by the apartheid-era government of South Africa. Project Coast was the successor to a limited postwar CBW program, which mainly produced the lethal agents CX powder and mustard gas; as well as non-lethal tear gas for riot control purposes. The program was headed by the cardiologist Wouter Basson, who was also the personal physician of South African Prime Minister P. W. Botha.

History
From 1975 onwards, the South African Defence Force (SADF) found itself embroiled in conventional battles in Angola as a result of the South African Border War. The perception that its enemies had access to battlefield chemical and biological weapons led South Africa to begin expanding its own program, initially as a defensive measure and by carrying out research on vaccines. As the years went on, research was carried out on offensive uses of the newly found capability. Finally, in 1981, President P. W. Botha ordered the SADF to develop the technology so that it could be used effectively against South Africa's enemies. In response, the head of the South African Medical Service (SAMS) division, which was responsible for defensive CBW capabilities, hired Dr Wouter Basson, a cardiologist, to visit other countries and report back on their respective CBW capabilities. He returned with the recommendation that South Africa's program be expanded. In 1983, Project Coast was formed, with Dr Basson at its head.

To hide the program and to make the procurement of CBW-related substances, Project Coast led to the formation of four front companies: Delta G Scientific Company, Roodeplaat Research Laboratories (RRL), Protechnik and Infladel.

Project Coast created a progressively larger variety of lethal offensive CBW toxins and biotoxins, in addition to the defensive measures. Initially, they were intended for use by the military in combat as a last resort. To that end, Soviet techniques were being copied, and devices were designed that looked like ordinary objects but had the capabilities to poison those who were targeted for assassination. Examples included umbrellas and walking sticks that fired pellets containing poison, syringes disguised as screwdrivers, and poisoned beer cans and envelopes. In the early 1990s, with the end of apartheid, South Africa's various weapons of mass destruction programs were stopped. Despite efforts to destroy equipment, stocks, and information from those programs, some still remain. That has led to fears that they may find their way into the hands of terrorist networks. In May 2002, Dr. Daan Goosen, the former head of South Africa's biological weapons program, contacted the American FBI and offered to exchange existing bacterial stocks from the program in return for US$5 million, together with immigration permits for him and 19 other associates and their family members. The offer was eventually refused, with the FBI claiming that the strains were obsolete and therefore no longer a threat.

Unusual features
The South African chemical weapons program investigated all the standard CW agents such as irritant riot control agents, lethal nerve agents and anticholinergic deliriants, which have been researched by virtually all countries that have carried out CW research. The South African program differed in its aims from the CBW programmes of many countries in that a major focus of the program was to develop nonlethal agents to help suppress internal dissent. That led to the investigation of unusual nonlethal agents, including illicit recreational drugs such as phencyclidine, MDMA, methaqualone and cocaine, as well as medicinal drugs such as diazepam, midazolam, ketamine, suxamethonium and tubocurarine, as potential incapacitating agents. According to the testimony given by Wouter Basson to the Truth and Reconciliation Commission, analogues of the compounds were prepared and studied, and both methaqualone and MDMA (along with the deliriant BZ) were manufactured in large quantities and successfully weaponised into a fine dust or aerosol form that could be released over a crowd as a potential riot control agent. Basson was later found to have also been selling large quantities of MDMA and methaqualone as tablets on the black market, but the amount manufactured was far larger than what was sold, and the court accepted that at least some genuine weaponisation and testing of the agents had been done. A black mamba and extracted venom were also part of the research, as were E. coli O157:H7 bacteria genetically modified to produce some of the toxins made by Clostridium perfringens bacteria. A list of purchases at RRL and other documents include references to such things as the snake, biological agents such as anthrax, brucellosis, cholera and salmonella among others, and chemicals including aluminium phosphide, thallium acetate, sodium azide, sodium cyanide, mercury oxycyanide, cantharides, colchicine, powerful anticoagulants such as brodifacoum, phenylsilatranes, strychnine, paraquat, "knockout drops", digoxin, acetylcholinesterase inhibitors such as aldicarb and paraoxon and other poisons. Other plans referenced in the UN report included crowd control with pheromones, and discussion of the development of several novel compounds, including a locally produced variant of BZ, novel derivatives of CR gas including "a compound which had a pyridine moiety in place of one of the benzene rings...[and] caused severe blisters on the skin", a new, more potent analogue of methaqualone and a "dimethylketone-amphetamine" derivative of MDMA. Another unusual project attempted to develop a method of sterilising crowds using a known male sterilant, pyridine . That was to be sprayed onto the crowds from a gas cylinder pressurised with nitrogen gas since pyridine is highly flammable. A subsequent industrial accident caused the death of a gas company employee when the experimental contaminated medical oxygen cylinder had been returned to the gas supplier and filled with oxygen that exploded.

Employment 

In 1985, four SWAPO detainees held at Reconnaissance Regiment headquarters were allegedly given a sleeping drug in soft drinks, taken to Lanseria airport outside Johannesburg, and injected with three toxic substances supplied by Basson. Their bodies were thrown into the Atlantic Ocean.

The Civil Cooperation Bureau operative Petrus Jacobus Botes, who claimed to have also directed bureau operations in Mozambique and Swaziland, asserted that he was ordered in May 1989 to contaminate the water supply at Dobra, a refugee camp in Namibia, with cholera and yellow fever organisms. A South African Army doctor provided them to him. In late August 1989, he led an attempt to contaminate the water supply, but it failed because of the high chlorine content in the treated water at the camp.

Component of racial warfare 
Research on birth control methods to reduce the black birth rate was one such area. Dr. Daan Goosen, the managing director of Roodeplaat Research Laboratories between 1983 and 1986, told Tom Mangold of the BBC that Project Coast had supported a project to develop a contraceptive that would have been applied clandestinely to blacks. Goosen reported that the project had developed a "vaccine" for males and females and that the researchers were still searching for a means by which it could be delivered to make black people sterile without them being made aware. Dr Shalk Van Rensburg stated that “fertility and fertility control studies comprised 18% of all projects”. Testimony given at the Truth and Reconciliation Commission (TRC) suggested that Project Coast researchers were also looking into putting birth control substances in water supplies. The project officer for Project Coast, Dr Woutter Basson, was put on trial for 64 charges all of which were committed while he held that position. Goosen testified that when asked what motivated him, Basson had replied that “although we do not have any doubt that Black people will take over the country one day, when my daughter asks me what I did to prevent this, at least my conscience will be clean” There is much mystery surrounding the international involvement in the project, as it would not have been able to develop without some form of international support but no country has been directly implemented despite strong links to Israel and Libya. While focus on Apartheid South Africa’s research into fertility is barely part of the ongoing discussion regarding project coast, it can be argued that what occurred constituted conspiracy to commit genocide in international law.

See also

 Eugenio Berríos
 Medical experimentation in Africa
 Poison laboratory of the Soviet secret services
 Project Andrea
 Project MKUltra
 Rhodesia and weapons of mass destruction
 South Africa and weapons of mass destruction
 Unethical human experimentation
 Unit 731
 Zulu (2013 film)

References

Further reading

 Glenn Cross, Dirty War: Rhodesia and Chemical Biological Warfare, 1975–1980, Helion & Company, 2017

External links 
 Chandré Gould, Peter I. Folb: Project Coast: Apartheid's Chemical and Biological Warfare Programme, United Nations Publications, 2002 on-line version of the book
 Helen E. Purkitt, Stephen F. Burgess: The Rollback of South Africa's Chemical and Biological Warfare Program, 2001 on-line version of the book
 Public Broadcasting Service special report: Plague War: What Happened in South Africa?
 Apartheid government sought germs to kill blacks
 Ecstasy Produced for "Riot Control" in South Africa
 Apartheid South Africa´s Chemical and Biological Warfare Program on-line article containing extensive documentation on Project Coast

Project Coast
Project Coast
Project Coast
Projcet Coast
Abandoned military projects of South Africa
Bioterrorism
Chemical weapons by country
Biological weapons by country
Medical experimentation on prisoners
South Africa and weapons of mass destruction
Human subject research in South Africa